Occirhenea is a genus of medium-sized predatory air-breathing land snails, carnivorous terrestrial pulmonate gastropod molluscs in the family Rhytididae.

Species
Species within the genus Occirhenea include:
 Occirhenea georgiana

References

 Nomenclator Zoologicus info

Rhytididae
Taxonomy articles created by Polbot